Constituent Assembly elections were held in the Free City of Danzig on 16 May 1920. The German National People's Party emerged as the largest party, receiving 28% of the vote and winning 34 of the 120 seats in the Volkstag. Voter turnout was 70%.

Results

References

Elections in the Free City of Danzig
Danzig
1920 elections in Germany
May 1920 events